A Wife in Danger (Italian: Una moglie in pericolo) is a 1939 Italian "white-telephones" comedy film directed by Max Neufeld and starring Marie Glory, Antonio Centa and Carlo Lombardi. It is a "White Telephone" film, shot at the Cinecittà Studios in Rome.

Cast
 Marie Glory as Mary Arnold Verdier  
 Antonio Centa as Giorgio De Martius  
 Carlo Lombardi as Pietro Verdier  
 Laura Solari as Michelina  
 Guglielmo Barnabò as Luigi Arnold  
 Sandra Ravel as Ilona, the friend of Luigi Arnold  
 Afra Arrigoni Fantoni as Aunt Clementina  
 Corrado De Cenzo as the Commissioner Melvet  
 Vasco Creti as Professor Duval 
 Bruno Calabretta as a detective  
 Luigi Erminio D'Olivo as Boulanger 
 Liana Del Balzo as an invitee to the wedding party  
 Armando Garozzo as a detective  
 Hella Kolniak as a traveller  
 Alfredo Martinelli as Gaby's husband  
 Silvia Melandri as Gaby  
 Alfredo Menichelli as a friend from Budapest  
 Lina Tartara Minora as Mary's maid  
 Guido Notari as the auctioneer  
 Giuseppe Pierozzi as the secretary  
 Dina Romano as the housekeeper

References

Bibliography 
 Landy, Marcia. Fascism in Film: The Italian Commercial Cinema, 1931-1943. Princeton University Press, 2014.

External links 
 

1939 films
Italian comedy films
1939 comedy films
1930s Italian-language films
Films directed by Max Neufeld
Italian black-and-white films
Films shot at Cinecittà Studios
Films scored by Alessandro Cicognini
1930s Italian films